Ziarat-e Mir Meqdad (also Romanized as Zīārat-e Mīr Meqdād and Zīārat-e Mīr Moqdād; also known as Zeyāratgāh-e Mīr Megdād, Zīāratgāh-e Mīr Meghdād, and Zīāratgāh-e Mīr Meqdād) is a village in Jazmurian Rural District, Jazmurian District, Rudbar-e Jonubi County, Kerman Province, Iran. At the 2006 census, its population was 1,778, in 366 families.

References 

Populated places in Rudbar-e Jonubi County